Kenneth Edward Untener (August 3, 1937 – March 27, 2004) was an American prelate of the Roman Catholic Church. He served as bishop of the Diocese of Saginaw in Michigan from 1980 until his death in 2004

Biography

Early life 
Kenneth Untener was born in Detroit, Michigan, on August 3, 1937,  the seventh of nine children. His family lived on Belle Isle, where his father for the recreation department. Kenneth Untener attended the Sacred Heart Seminary in Detroit, followed by St. John's Seminary in Plymouth, Michigan.

Untener played golf, ice hockey, and handball. In 1962, while playing handball, he broke his right leg. Due to complications from a genetic deformity to his ankle, doctors were forced to amputate his  leg below the knee. Untener wore a prosthesis for the rest of his life.  Untener had this view of the amputation“A deformed leg was socially awkward. A wooden leg is not. … You can kid about it. But the experience of my leg was most valuable to me. I think I know something of what it’s like to be the only woman in a room of men or the only black among whites. I know what it’s like to be noticed. I’ve been made sensitive to that.”

Ordination 
Untener was ordained to the priesthood for the Archdiocese of Detroit by Bishop John Dearden on June 1, 1963 in Detroit. After his ordination, Untener served in Detroit for a time, and then studied at the Pontifical Gregorian University in Rome, earning a doctorate. He returned to the United States, taught at Sacred Heart Seminary, and eventually became the rector of St. John's Provincial Seminary in Plymouth, Michigan in 1977.

Bishop of Saginaw 
In 1980, Pope John Paul II appointed Untener as the fourth bishop of the Diocese of Saginaw. After his appointment, some people filed complaints with the Vatican about a recent workshop for seminarians on sexuality that Untener had authorized at St. John's Seminary. The claim was that the workshop promoted lewdness and promiscuity. Untener made two trips to the Vatican and appeal to the pope. On the second trip, Detroit Cardinal John Dearden accompanied Untener, publicly supporting him. Untener was consecrated bishop on November 24, 1980. Untener later stated of the ordeal, "Having experienced that right away freed me of the burden of trying to be held in favor."

Upon his consecration, Untener sold the bishop's mansion and began a career-long practice of living for periods of time in the various rectories of the diocese with his priests.   Untener also was made an honorary member of the Saginaw Gears hockey team in the early 1980s and took to the ice in a Gears jersey but was unable to help the team win; he also played hockey regularly with friends for many years after becoming a bishop.

In 2000, Untener created the first Little Black Book, which followed lectio divina (divine reading) to help people spend pray to God. He soon decided to create similar versions of the book for the seasons of Easter (The Little White Book), and Advent/Christmas (The Little Blue Book).

In 1979, Untener wrote a homily for Cardinal Dearden that included the poetic reflection, "We are prophets of a future not our own."  Dearden delivered the homily at a Mass for Deceased Priests on October 25, 1979. The phrase later became associated with the life of Archbishop Oscar Romero, acquiring the title "the Romero Prayer".  Pope Francis quoted this reflection verbatim in his remarks to the Roman Curia on December 21, 2015.

Sex abuse scandal 
In 2002, an Ohio man accused a priest in the Diocese of Saginaw of sexually molesting him as a minor during the 1980s.  The priest was John Hammer, pastor of St. Mary's parish in Alma, Michigan.  In the early 1980s, Hammer was serving in a parish in the Diocese of Youngstown in Ohio.  After the accusations were made, he was removed from ministry and sent for treatment at a facility in Maryland for several years.  In 1990, he petitioned Untener for a transfer to the Diocese of Saginaw, admitting his guilt and asking for another chance.

Before accepting Hammer, Untener requested two medical opinions about his fitness to return to ministry.  When he received a positive report, Untener accepted the transfer, but partnered him with a senior priest for observation.  Hammer was sent to Mt. St. Joseph Parish in St. Louis, Michigan and then to St. Mary's. Untener did not notify either parish of Hammer's record.  When the victim came forward in 2002, Hammer admitted his guilt at St. Mary's  He was removed from ministry and later laicized.

Death and legacy 
After a period of illness, Kenneth Untener died at age 66 of a form of leukemia on March 27, 2004. His death was a shock to many people, as it had only been announced six weeks prior that he suffered from leukemia. His funeral Mass was celebrated in Saginaw and included a homily by Archbishop John R. Quinn. Three years after his death, some of Untener's reflections were collected in a book, The Practical Prophet: Pastoral Writings.

Views

Equality
Untener's career was marked by a consistent focus on egalitarianism in the church, ministry to the poor and participative liturgy.  His liberal views often put him at odds with orthodox Catholics and with the Vatican. He was regarded as being sensitive to the viewpoints of liberal Catholics. His overall view was that one should keep an open mind, consider the logic of one's actions and how they affect the church, and reflect openly over controversial issues. He frequently derided the Vatican for avoiding debate on real issues that potentially harmed the entire church.

Diversity
Untener frequently observed that Jesus kept quite diverse company in his lifetime, including many people who were unwelcome in the synagogues of the time. Untener felt that modern Catholics should adopt this view in welcoming people into their own parishes. He was noted for his advocation of helping the poor, and his emphasis that needy people should be treated equally and not judged for their worthiness of help. He spoke out for women's rights in society and in the church, although never outright endorsing the ordination of women as priests.

Birth control
Some of the more controversial issues that Untener addressed were modern church attitudes toward birth control and abortion. He occasionally lamented that the church was moving toward "corporate severity" instead of a more accepting state of mind. He was an outspoken critic of the church's ban on artificial birth control. He collaborated on writing about abortion issues, and advocated for developing programs that openly addressed abortion issues faced by families. Some referred to his views as "ultra-liberal", while others argued that Untener simply liked to question things, even when doing so was difficult or controversial.

Liturgy
Untener also organized a series of preaching seminars for priests.  At the 1993 National Conference of Bishops meeting, Untener reportedly interrupted the proceedings by commenting on how many people felt bored during Mass.  Untener told a reporter, "They were talking about the niceties of phrases – debating whether `prince' or `ruler' was a better word to use in the lectionary." Untener stood up and shouted, "The biggest problem is not whether we use `prince' or `ruler.' The biggest problem is the Mass is boring for most people."  Untener encouraged priests to stick to one point in their homilies and to keep their talks at seven minutes or less.

References 

1937 births
2004 deaths
Deaths from leukemia
Sacred Heart Major Seminary alumni
Pontifical Gregorian University alumni
Clergy from Detroit
People from Saginaw, Michigan
21st-century Roman Catholic bishops in the United States
Roman Catholic Archdiocese of Detroit
Roman Catholic bishops of Saginaw
20th-century Roman Catholic bishops in the United States